"Rejection" is a song by
Martin Solveig. The song was released in France as a CD single on 2 July 2007. It was released as the fourth and final single from his second studio album Hedonist (2005). Solveig wrote and produced the song, which peaked at number 34 on the French Singles Chart.

Track listing

Chart performance

Weekly charts

Release history

References

2007 songs
Martin Solveig songs
Songs written by Martin Solveig